Eldho Abraham is an Indian politician. He was the MLA from Muvattupuzha in Ernakulam district, Assembly constituency Kerala in 14th legislative assembly. He defeated Congress leader Joseph Vazhakkan in the 2016 elections to the Kerala Assembly by 9375 votes. Abraham represents the Communist Party of India (CPI).

He fractured his hand when struck by a cane in one of the protests he was a participant.

Political career
Started political life through A.I.S.F. in 1991; 
 He was, University Union Councillor (1995, 1996), Executive member, M.G. University Union; Member, Students Council, M.G. University; Councillor, I.T.I. Union; 
District Secretary and State Secretariat Member, A.I.S.F.; President and Secretary, A.I.Y.F. Muvattupuzha; District President and Secretary, State Committee Member, A.I.Y.F.;
Member of Payyipra Grama Panchayat (2005, 2010) and Chairman, Ward Development Sub Committee. 
Now Member, C.P.I. District Committee; Secretary, Toddy Workers Federation, Muvattupuzha Mandalam; 
Director of Thrikkalathur Service Co-operative Bank.

See also
Eldho

References

Kerala MLAs 2016–2021
Communist Party of India politicians from Kerala
Living people
People from Muvattupuzha
1975 births